François Neuens (Gonderange, 6 September 1912 — Wiltz, 27 August 1985) was a Luxembourgian professional road bicycle racer. In the 1939 Tour de France, Neuens won two stages. During the Second World War, Neuens won two editions of the Tour de Luxembourg. He competed in the individual and team road race events at the 1936 Summer Olympics.

Major results

1938
Luxembourg - Nancy
Tour du Lac Léman
1939
Tour de France:
Winner stages 12A and 17A
1941
Echarpe d'Or
1942
Tour de Luxembourg
1943
Tour de Luxembourg

References

External links
 
Official Tour de France results for François Neuens

Luxembourgian male cyclists
Luxembourgian Tour de France stage winners
1912 births
1985 deaths
People from Grevenmacher (canton)
Tour de Suisse stage winners
Olympic cyclists of Luxembourg
Cyclists at the 1936 Summer Olympics